Beaton–Powell House, also known as Home Place, is a historic plantation house located at Boykins, Southampton County, Virginia. It was built in 1857, and is a two-story, Greek Revival style, timber frame dwelling with Italianate style embellishments.  It features a massive, elaborate two-tiered
central portico supported by three conspicuous diagonal braces link together four paired, seven-inch square chamfered columns.

It was listed on the National Register of Historic Places in 2008.

References below

Plantation houses in Virginia
Houses on the National Register of Historic Places in Virginia
Greek Revival houses in Virginia
Italianate architecture in Virginia
Houses completed in 1857
Houses in Southampton County, Virginia
National Register of Historic Places in Southampton County, Virginia
1857 establishments in Virginia